is a 2003-2005 Kerberos saga manga written by Mamoru Oshii and illustrated by Mamoru Sugiura who was in charge of the continuity in the Kerberos Panzer Cop manga. The story is the sequel to the Kerberos Panzer Cop and a prequel to the StrayDog movie.

Plot 

Kerberos Koichi Todome (都々目紅一) chases elite sniper Eito Kurosaki (黒崎英斗) a.k.a. "Afghan Hound" in Asia with a vengeance. During the Kerberos Riot event (see Kerberos Panzer Cop Act 8), Kurosaki betrayed the Special Armed Garrison by letting know Bunmei Muroto about the coup d'état. Kurosaki left the besieged Self-Police headquarters using a helicopter and escaped overseas, since then, Koichi is after him, the once brothers in arms are now deadly enemies.

The Killers (キラーズ)
"The Killers" (キラーズ, kirāzu) is an independent short story which is a parody of Ernest Hemingway's classic "The Killers". Two Latinos dressed in black enter the bar restaurant "Papa's Lunch Room" located downtown in a Latin American city. Three other customers are silently waiting, each one on a separated table: the first is a yakuza wearing black sunglasses and a tuxedo, the second is a middle-aged hairy bearded man wearing a black cassock and a large crucifix necklace and the third is a British style old man wearing a beret and a smart costume, a violin case standing near him. The two men in black ask for the menu and order sandwiches. As they eat, a young boy enters and delivers a large package to Golgo 13, the latter goes to the toilet bringing the packet with him. A Latino hits the restaurant's chef with his sandwich plate, binds him and brings him to the toilet. The other Latino puts a Glock 17 and a FN Hi-Power automatic handguns on his table and asks for the waitress about Koichi Todome. The second Latino comes back from the toilet armed with a Lupara sawed-off shotgun, followed by Golgo 13 smoking a cigarette and holding a Colt AR-15 semi-automatic rifle. The old man takes a drum magazine M1928 Thompson submachine gun from his violin case, and the priest unveils a katana from his cassock. Each men are aiming at each other stand still. When the girl bursts her bubble gum all men suddenly attack eventually killing each other. Lone survivor, the girl frees the chef and rides her Vespa to the outskirts. She enters a coast hotel, bumps a woman and run up stairs to the room 203 to tell Koichi Todome. The latter is lying in his bed still wearing his famous trench coat, and a large suitcase containing his Protect Gear is on the ground. Midori thanks the girl who leaves, grabs her Mauser C96 pistol and heads to the staircase. The story ends with Midori entering room 203.

Related works

Kerberos Panzer Cop
Kerberos Saga Rainy Dogs is the follow-up to the 1988~2000 manga Kerberos Panzer Cop written by Mamoru Oshii and illustrated by Kamui Fujiwara. Flashback sequences from the Kerberos Panzer Cop key event called "Kerberos Riot" are depicted in Rainy Dogs.

StrayDog: Kerberos Panzer Cops
The plot of Kerberos Saga Rainy Dogs happens before the events depicted in StrayDog, Koichi left Latin America with his suitcase and is now living in Taiwan.

Killers
The short story "The Killers" was published prior to Rainy Dogs and in order to coincide with the theater release of Mamoru Oshii's eponymous live-action compilation movie Killers.

The Killers
Mamoru Oshii's The Killers is a parody of the eponymous classic short story by American writer Ernest Hemingway published in 1927. Russian filmmaker Andrei Tarkovsky, a known influence of Oshii, adapted The Killers for the screen in 1956 as his first student short film.

Golgo 13
The yakuza character "Togo 13" appearing in The Killers is a cameo of Golgo 13 from the eponymous franchise.

Issues
Like its prequel, Kerberos Saga Rainy Dogs was first serialized in a B5 comics magazine before to be published as a compilation volume.

Ace Tokunoh serialization (B5)
Kerberos Saga Rainy Dogs was first published in Ace Tokunoh (エース特濃, Esu Tokunou), a comic magazine owned by Kadokawa Shoten.
2003.05: Ace Tokunoh vol.1
The Killers
キラーズ
2003.06: Ace Tokunoh vol.2
Kerberos Saga Rainy Dogs - Act 01: Break Up
Rainy Dogs 紅い足痕
2003.0X: Ace Tokunoh vol.3
Kerberos Saga Rainy Dogs - Act 02: Technical Shot
Rainy Dogs 紅い足痕
2003.09: Ace Tokunoh vol.4
Kerberos Saga Rainy Dogs - Act 03: Bank Shot
Rainy Dogs 紅い足痕
2003.0X: Ace Tokunoh vol.5
Kerberos Saga Rainy Dogs - Act 04: Cannon Shot
Rainy Dogs 紅い足痕
2004.01: Ace Tokunoh vol.6
Kerberos Saga Rainy Dogs - Act 05: Hug Shot (color)
Rainy Dogs 紅い足痕 (color)
2004.0X: Ace Tokunoh vol.7
Kerberos Saga Rainy Dogs - Act 06: Follow Shot
Rainy Dogs 紅い足痕
2004.05: Ace Tokunoh vol.8
Kerberos Saga Rainy Dogs - Act 07: Time Shot
Rainy Dogs 紅い足痕
2004.07: Ace Tokunoh vol.9
Kerberos Saga Rainy Dogs - Act 08: Eight Ball Shot
Rainy Dogs 紅い足痕

Original edition (A5)
The compilation volume was published by Kadokawa in its "New Type 100% Comics" collection (ニュータイプ100%コミックス). The dusk cover features a red obi with the manga's international title "Kerberos Saga Rainy Dogs". The previously unreleased prologue "Act 00: Set Up" was added to help in the understanding of the complex background and the 2003 short story "The Killers" (first issued in Ace Tokunoh vol.1) was also included as an epilogue. 
2005.10.26: Kerberos Saga: Rainy Dogs
犬狼伝説 紅い足痕
A5 (384p.) Kadokawa Shoten

References

External links
 Official website 
 Kerberos saga official website 

2003 manga
Kerberos saga
Seinen manga